Mr. Football Award may refer to:

Mr. Football Award (Alabama)
Mr. Football Award (Florida)
Mr. Football Award (Indiana)
Mr. Football Award (Kentucky)
Mr. Football Award (Louisiana)
Mr. Football Award (Michigan)
Mr. Football Award (Minnesota)
Mr. Football Award (Ohio)
Mr. Football Award (Pennsylvania)
Mr. Football Award (Philippines)
Mr. Football Award (South Carolina)
Mr. Football Award (Texas)